Soundarcade is a Latvian progressive rock, post-metal band. The band was formed in 2002 in Riga.

Soundarcade's music features influences ranging from Latvian folk music to spaghetti westerns, and structures of progressive rock music. Raw sound is provided by dark, swirling guitars, angry drumming, dissonant, howling violin and pulsing bass.

The band released its debut album, 12 Songs of the Jackalope, through the independent Latvian label Melo Records”and is now working on new material. Soundarcade represent Latvian music with live performances that are always supplemented by custom-made visuals.

Discography

Studio albums 
 12 Songs of the Jackalope (2006)
 Daughters of Molestia (2009)
 Moving the Great Hadron (2012)

Current members 
 Martins Abols – vocals
 Lauris Abele – guitar
 Raitis Abele – guitar, mandolin
 Janis Zale – bass
 Gints Spole – drums
 Ingus Kempaus - violin

References

External links 
 Official website
 Official MySpace page
 Melo Records

Latvian progressive rock groups
Post-metal musical groups
Latvian post-rock groups
Latvian rock music groups
Latvian heavy metal musical groups
Musical groups established in 2002